is a 2006 role-playing video game developed by Brownie Brown and HAL Laboratory and published by Nintendo for the Game Boy Advance. It is the third entry in the Mother series. The game follows Lucas, a young boy with psychic abilities, and a party of characters as they attempt to prevent a mysterious invading army from corrupting and destroying the world.

Like previous entries, Mother 3 focuses on exploring the game world from a top-down perspective and engaging in turn-based combat with enemies. Its development spanned twelve years and four consoles, beginning in 1994 for the Super Famicom and then transitioning to the Nintendo 64 and its 64DD add-on. It was initially canceled in 2000, but development was restarted in 2003 for the Game Boy Advance.

Mother 3 was never localized or released outside Japan, due to its release near the end of the Advance's lifespan and the company focusing on the Nintendo DS. However, it was a critical and commercial success in the years that followed and has generated a cult following, in which it received critical praise for its character development, stylized graphics, music, story, and more mature and dramatic tone than its previous installments, but was criticized for its lack of innovation in the role-playing genre.

An unofficial English fan translation was released by the Starmen.net internet community in 2008, and received over 100,000 downloads within a week. Mother 3 was re-released for the Wii U Virtual Console in Japan in 2016.

Gameplay 
Mother 3 is a single-player role playing video game similar to previous games in the Mother series. The player controls a party of playable characters who explore the game's two-dimensional fictional world, primarily shown from a top-down perspective. While navigating the overworld, the player may converse with non-player characters, obtain items, or encounter enemies. Winning battles against enemies awards experience points to the party, which is required for leveling up. Leveling up a character permanently enhances its individual attributes such as maximum hit points (HP), power points (PP), offense, and defense. Weapons, armor, or accessories can be equipped on a character to increase certain attributes. The player can restore their characters' HP and PP or heal various status ailments by visiting hot springs which are abundant in the game world, and the player can save the game by talking to frogs. Currency is introduced in the later half of the game as Dragon Points (DP), earned by winning battles and used to purchase items. The player can deposit or withdraw DP from frogs.

Mother 3 retains the turn-based battle system featured in EarthBound. When the player comes into contact with an enemy in the overworld, the game transitions to a battle screen. Battles are viewed from a presumed first-person perspective, showing the enemies against a distorted, animated background. The player can assign each character in their party to perform an action, such as attacking an enemy or using items to restore HP or PP. Some characters can utilize psychic-based abilities referred to as PSI, which includes stronger attacks and healing abilities, and require PP to execute. Like EarthBound, combat uses a "rolling health" system: when one of the player's characters is injured, its HP will gradually "roll" down, similar to an odometer, rather than immediately decremented. This allows a mortally wounded character to perform actions like attacking or healing themselves, as long as the player acts quickly enough. If a character loses all HP, it will become unconscious and cannot participate unless revived by another character. The player loses a battle if all characters become unconscious; the player will then be given the option to continue play from the nearest save point, but with half the DP on their person.

Combat in Mother 3 includes a unique musical combo system not seen in previous Mother games. When one of the player's characters directly attacks an enemy with a weapon, they can repeatedly attack the enemy by pressing the button in time with the beat of the background music, with each enemy possessing a musical theme with different rhythms. Using this system, the player can attack the enemy up to sixteen times in a row. When the correct beat is not apparent, the player can put the enemy to sleep to isolate the beat from the music.

Plot 
Mother 3 is set in the fictional Nowhere Islands, an unknown length of time after the events of Mother 2. The game begins with twins Lucas and Claus and their mother Hinawa preparing to return home to Tazmily Village after visiting Hinawa's father, who lives in the northern reaches of the Islands. Before they can return, Tazmily Village is attacked by a mysterious military force known as the Pigmask Army, who bomb the nearby forest and start a forest fire. Hinawa's husband, Flint, is alerted to the fire and sets out to rescue his family. He finds Lucas and Claus, but discovers that Hinawa was killed defending them from a hostile Drago, a normally peaceful lizard-like creature. Later, Claus leaves the village to take revenge on the Drago; Flint attempts to follow him and discovers and defeats the Drago, which has been turned into a cyborg, but fails to find Claus.

In response to the Pigmasks' invasion, neophyte thief Duster is sent by his father and teacher Wess to the abandoned Osohe Castle to retrieve the mysterious Egg of Light. While there he meets the spirited young Princess Kumatora, but both he and the Egg are caught in a trap and vanish. At the same time a mysterious peddler known as Yokuba, who works with the Pigmasks, sells television-like devices known as Happy Boxes to the townspeople, with the unwilling help of a monkey named Salsa who he abuses. Yokuba introduces the villagers to the concept of currency, giving some money to one of them and then framing Duster for the theft of it. Salsa escapes from Yokuba's control with the help of Kumatora, Lucas, and Wess.

Three years later, Tazmily Village has been taken over by the Pigmask Army, who have modernized it with railways, Happy Boxes, and other modern technology. Lucas hears rumours that Duster, who has been missing since leaving for Osohe Castle, is working as a bassist at the nearby Club Titiboo, and sets off with his dog Boney. While travelling there, he learns psychic powers from a superpowered, benevolent, androgynous creature known as a Magypsy. At the club, he finds Kumatora working as a waitress, as well as Duster, who has lost his memory. They join and recover the Egg and restore Duster's memory, but while attempting to board a flying Pigmask airship, a mysterious Masked Man shakes them off and sends them flying to the ground, separating them.

Lucas and Boney land in a haystack back in Tazmily, and learn from the Magypsies that beneath the Islands is a massive dragon. The Magypsies' purpose is to guard seven Needles that were placed in the dragon to control its power; whoever pulls most of the Needles will be able to use the dragon's incredible power to completely reshape the world. Because of this, the Masked Man is trying to find and pull the Needles. Lucas and Boney reunite with Duster and Kumatora and race to pull the Needles before the Masked Man, but only manage to pull three before him, with the Masked Man pulling another three.

The seventh and final Needle is located beneath New Pork City, the capital of the Pigmasks. Lucas and company travel there and meet Leder, another villager, who reveals that the inhabitants of Tazmily Village are the last survivors of a global apocalypse, who travelled to the Nowhere Islands as they were protected by the dragon's power. To prevent a second apocalypse from reoccurring, the survivors sealed their previous memories in the Egg of Light; Leder was given the role of revealing the truth if the situation called for it. He also reveals that the leader of the Pigmasks is Porky Minch, who after the events of Mother 2 travelled in time to the Nowhere Islands and began building an empire there, kidnapping inhabitants from other time periods (including Dr. Andonuts from Mother 2) to populate it, as well as transforming the local wildlife into twisted new forms (including the Drago that killed Hinawa).

Lucas and company set out to confront Porky and pull the last needle. While fighting their way to him, they discover that Yokuba was the Magypsy responsible for protecting the seventh Needle, who turned traitor and started working for the Pigmasks. The heroes confront Porky deep beneath New Pork City, but he seals himself inside an "Absolutely Safe Capsule" built by Dr. Andonuts; unbeknownst to him, however, Andonuts has tricked him, as the Absolutely Safe Capsule also renders the outside world safe by permanently sealing Porky within it.

Lucas reaches the seventh needle and confronts the Masked Man, who is revealed to be a brainwashed Claus. During the battle between Claus and Lucas, Claus's memory of his mother restores his humanity and he commits suicide. Lucas pulls the final Needle, awakening the Dragon and destroying the Nowhere Islands.

In an epilogue set in pitch darkness, the game's cast reveals that they have survived and wish the player farewell. After the credits, the Mother 3 logo is shown restored to being made completely of wood.

Development 

Development of Mother 3 began in 1994 for the Super Famicom with Shigeru Miyamoto and Satoru Iwata as producers. The team mostly consisted of members involved in the development of the previous Mother game, EarthBound. Inspired by Super Mario 64, the team transitioned from the Super Famicom to the Nintendo 64, believing that they could also creatively flourish by making a 3D world without technical restrictions. However, their early specifications exceeded the capabilities and memory limits of Nintendo 64; halfway through development the team scaled back its large scope and changed the platform to the 64DD, a Nintendo 64 expansion peripheral that was later released only in Japan in 1999. Mother 3 was expected to be a 64DD launch game, but development shifted back to the Nintendo 64 after the 64DD's commercial failure.

Nintendo showcased a demo of Mother 3 at the 1999 Nintendo Space World trade show. It was expected to be released in North America under the title EarthBound 64, on a 256-megabit cartridge, similar to The Legend of Zelda: Ocarina of Time. IGN reacted favorably to the demo and compared the multi-character narrative to the Japan-only Super Famicom RPG Live A Live, and Famitsu readers ranked the game as one of their top ten most anticipated towards the end of 1999.

Shigesato Itoi announced in late August 2000 that Mother 3 had been cancelled following a number of delays. Iwata and Miyamoto clarified in an interview that resources had been moved to the development of the GameCube, the next Nintendo console. Itoi stated that an additional two years would have been required to finish the game, which was 30% complete at the time of cancellation. Iwata stated retrospectively that the focus on 3D graphics made the project overcomplex. Miyamoto also stated that the Mother franchise had not been abandoned and that he was still interested in bringing the game to fruition.

In 2003, in a Japanese commercial for the compilation game Mother 1+2, Nintendo announced that it had restarted the development of Mother 3 for the portable Game Boy Advance console. Itoi had believed that restarting the project was impossible but changed his mind following encouragement from the Mother fanbase. Nintendo subsidiary Brownie Brown developed the game, with input from Itoi. While the graphics were changed from 3D to 2D, the story was not altered. Mother 3 was about 60% complete by July 2004, and was released on April 20, 2006 in Japan.

Design 

Itoi thought of the concept behind Mother 3 towards the end of Mother 2 production, a "detective story where the city was the main character". He thought of a hack, small-time, womanizing private investigator who would become engrossed in a big murder case, and the story would unfold from a young female clerk at a flower shop who would slowly recall parts of a story consequential to the plot. Thus, the city would appear to grow. This idea of a "single place changing over time" was central to Mother 3. Unlike previous RPGs, which he saw as "road movies" with little reason to revisit, he wanted the player to see the town gossip grow dynamically. It was enough of a departure from the series that the development team questioned whether fans would consider it part of the series. Itoi intended the game to have 12 chapters with various game mechanics and rotating player-characters. He conceptualized the development as moving 3D puppets before realizing the degree of programming required. As development wore on, Itoi reduced the scope of the chapters until seven or nine were left. The "uncomfortable beauty" of chimera—multiple creatures fused into one—was central to the game and the idea behind the metallic and wooden Mother 3 logo. Itoi served less of a manager role and more as a team member and scriptwriter than in previous Mother development cycles. He saw himself as simultaneously making the game he wanted to play and setting traps for the player, and as making a game Nintendo could not.

Itoi chose to use the pixelated style of Mother 2 for the Game Boy Advance Mother 3 because he was uninterested in computer graphics trends. The series' games were written in the hiragana alphabet instead of in kanji (Chinese characters) so as to remain accessible to young children. Itoi described the game world as governed by a "might equals right ... macho" power struggle. The antagonist, Porky, was designed as a "symbol of humankind", complementing Itoi's view of evil on a fungible morality spectrum with "pranks" and "crimes" at its extremes. Itoi compared the way in which the characters realize their psychic powers with menstruation and added that human physiology was "one of his themes". Players sweat when learning an ability based on Itoi's belief of how physical struggle facilitates growth. He also included characters like the Magypsies and Duster (who has a bad leg) to show the value of having friends with different qualities.

Another of his themes was the duality of the seriousness and lightheartedness of games, which is why he added a serious death scene to the first chapter. Itoi's Nintendo 64 version of the scenario was darker, "dirtier", and more upsetting, though the final version changed little in concept. Itoi attributed the change in tone to his own growth and the character composition of the new development team. Itoi later reflected on the ending's lesson on the virtue of helping bad people. Itoi felt that the ending's renewal theme reflected his worldview of appreciating our time on Earth in light of the planet's inevitable end. Much of the rest of the script was written after-hours at a local hotel where they would continue their work.

Music 

Shogo Sakai, a video game composer at HAL Laboratory whose previous works include music for Kirby Air Ride and Super Smash Bros. Melee, composed Mother 3 soundtrack. Shigesato Itoi stated that Sakai was chosen for the role given his deep understanding of the game's story and the EarthBound series in general, in addition to the fact that EarthBound composers Keiichi Suzuki and Hirokazu Tanaka were both unavailable. Sakai worked to make the music feel similar to previous entries in the series. The Mother 3 soundtrack was released on compact disc on November 2, 2006. Kyle Miller of RPGFan wrote that the game retained the quirkiness of the previous soundtracks in the series despite the change in composers. He found the second half of the album, which included reinterpreted "classics" from the series, to be its strongest.

"Love Theme", the main theme of Mother 3, was composed late in the game's development; earlier in development Itoi intended to use the "Pigmask Army" theme as the main theme of the game. During the creation of an important scene in the game, however, Sakai was asked to create a song that would have a greater impact than the Pigmask theme; upon its creation, it was chosen to be used as the main theme instead of the "Pigmask Army" song. Itoi claims that, given how quickly Sakai composed the song, that he had been "waiting for the order" to make a song like "Love Theme". Itoi requested that "Love Theme" be playable on a piano with only one finger, as the "Eight Melodies" theme from Mother had gained popularity and been played in elementary schools due to its simplicity. The "OK desu ka?" that plays after the player chooses the character's name was recorded without Itoi's knowledge by Hirokazu Tanaka more than a decade before the release of Mother 3.

Release 

Mother 3 was released in Japan on April 20, 2006, where it became a bestseller. Prior to its release, the game was in the "top five most wanted games" of Famitsu and at the top of the Japanese preordered game charts. At one point leading up to its release, the game's "Love Theme" would play as music on hold for the Japan Post. A limited edition Deluxe Box Set was produced with a special edition Game Boy Micro and Franklin Badge pin. The game was marketed in Japan with a television commercial that has Japanese actress Kō Shibasaki on the verge of tears as she explains her feelings about Mother 3. Itoi has said that her performance was unscripted. The game was released for the Japanese Virtual Console on the Wii U in December 2015. Game Informer editor Imran Khan alleges that Nintendo planned an English localization but canceled it due to fears that the central theme of bereavement, as well as instances of drug use and animal cruelty, would generate controversy. Former Nintendo of America president Reggie Fils-Aimé later said in an interview with Bloomberg News that the lack of localization was because it "just didn't make business sense" to make one for a game released very late in the handheld's lifespan. He also said that he was in talks with Iwata to possibly release it on the North American Wii U eShop prior to Iwata's passing.

Fan translation 

Mother 3 did not receive an official release outside Japan. On October 17, 2008, Starmen.net released a fan translation patch that, when applied on a copy of the Mother 3 ROM image, translates all the game's text into English. Reid Young, co-founder of Starmen.net, stated that when they realized Nintendo was not going to localize Mother 3, they decided to undertake the task, for themselves and for fans of the game. The translation team consisted of around a dozen individuals, including project lead Clyde "Tomato" Mandelin, a professional Japanese-to-English translator. The project took two years and thousands of work-hours to complete; it was estimated that the theoretical freelance cost of the translation was $30,000.

The project included translating, writing, and revising about 1,000 pages of the game script in addition to extensive ROM hacking and testing to ensure that the game properly displays the translated text. The translation included minor deviations from the original, such as localization of place names and puns. The few dramatic changes included renaming some characters and locations. The ROM hacking entailed assembly-level changes to the game code to support features such as variable width fonts.

The team reported that "the highest levels" of Nintendo of America knew about their project, though they did not intervene. The localization team planned to end the project if Nintendo were to make an announcement about the future of the game, or if they were asked to cease development of the translation. They acknowledged that the legality of the localization was unclear since the final translation required use of an emulator or a flash cartridge. The localization patch was downloaded over 100,000 times in the first week following its release. Along with the translation, the team announced the Mother 3 Handbook, an English player's guide for the game that had been in development since June 2008. Wired reported the full-color, 200-page player's guide to be akin to a professional strategy guide, with quality "on par with ... Prima Games and BradyGames". The Verge cited the two-year fan translation of Mother 3 as proof of the fan base's dedication, and Jenni Lada of TechnologyTell called it "undoubtedly one of the best known fan translations in existence", with active retranslations into other languages.

Reception 

Mother 3 received critical acclaim, it sold around 200,000 copies in its first week of sales in Japan and despite not having an English localization, critics imported it for reception and gave it mostly positive reviews. It was one of Japan's top 20 bestselling games for the first half of 2006, and received a "Platinum Hall of Fame" score of 35/40 from Japanese reviewer Weekly Famitsu. It ended the year with over 368,000 copies sold, the 36th highest of the year in Japan. Jenni Lada of TechnologyTell called it the "perfect" Game Boy Advance role-playing game. Reviewers praised its story (even though the game was only available in Japanese) and graphics, and lamented its 1990s role-playing game mechanics. Critics also complimented its music.

Famitsu reviewers noted the level of detail from the game's direction, accessibility and wit of the story, unconventional art style, and conventional game mechanics. They considered the timed battles to be both useful and difficult. Eurogamer Simon Parkin detailed the 12-year development, the series' legacy as both "one of Japan's most beloved" and the video game cognoscenti's "sacred cow", and the endurance of its fan community. He was impressed by the quality of the fan translation and described Itoi as a "storyteller" who chose the Japanese role-playing game medium to tell his story. Parkin noted how the "excellent" script unfurled from a "straightforward tale" into "breadth and depth of quality that few titles many times its budget achieve" with "affecting scenes" and "unexpected impact". He compared the chapter approach with the method of Dragon Quest IV. Parkin wrote that the script allowed for the somewhat "heavy-handed" juxtaposition of "nature and technology, feudalism and capitalism, individuals and community", and that what he first considers a name customization "trick" becomes useful later in the game. NGC Magazine Mark Green wrote that the game felt like Mother 2.5 in its look and feel, which he did not consider negative, albeit somewhat antiquated. Lada of TechnologyTell said Mother 3 was surprisingly "darker" than its forebears.

Eurogamer Parkin wrote that the "childlike" and "unusually Western" graphics were similar to EarthBound in "flat pastel textures devoid of shading" as juxtaposed with background art that "fizzes with life and character". He described the cutscenes' animations as "bespoke", rare for 16-bit role-playing games, and of greater dramatic impact. RPGamer Jordan Jackson wrote that the visuals are typical of the series and fit the game's mood, and the website's Mike Moehnke criticized the inventory limits carried over from the previous game. Green of NGC said the game mechanics were "depressingly basic" against more advanced role-playing games. Eurogamer Parkin felt that the role-playing game elements were less interesting and added that Mother 3 had few standout selling points other than its attention to detail and "only systemic innovation": the rhythm-based battle system. Kotaku Richard Eisenbeis praised the system, and GameSpot Greg Kasavin compared it with that of the Mario & Luigi series. Jackson wrote that the music was "just as catchy as previous games" despite being "almost completely new". Moehnke agreed, calling it "nothing less than stunning". He noted overtones of Wagner and Chuck Berry. Jackson said that the game was somewhat easier than the rest of the series and somewhat shorter, at about 30 hours in length. Both RPGamer reviewers noted that Mother 3 has few penalties for death. Jackson reflected that while the game is humorous and grows in enjoyment, it has some somber moments as well. Eisenbeis of Kotaku cited "the importance of mothers" as a key theme about which the game revolves, which he preferred to the mid-game "slapstick insanity" and final plot twist. Parkin wrote that the game was filled with "memorable moments", including a character who criticizes the player "for not giggling at puns", frogs with progressively silly costumes that save the game, a "reconstructed mecha caribou" battle, a bad haiku, and the "campfire scene", and that while the game's simpleness could have leaned towards "raw stupidity", instead it was "elegant in its simplicity".

Legacy 
Multiple critics wrote that Mother 3 was one of the best role-playing games for the Game Boy Advance. GamePro Jeremy Signor listed it among his "best unreleased Japanese role-playing games" for its script and attention to detail. Tim Rogers posited that Mother 3 was "the closest games have yet come to literature."

Nintendo has been heavily criticized for Mother 3 lack of an international release. IGN referred to the Mother series as "neglected" in regards to EarthBound being the only game to be released outside Japan across the decades until 2015. Bob Mackey of 1UP.com wrote of Mother 3 that "no other game in the history of time garnered such a rabid demand for translation," and Chris Plante of UGO Networks wrote that the lack of an official Mother 3 English localization was one of 2008's "worst heartbreaks". Frank Caron of Ars Technica said that the fan translation's "massive undertaking ... stands as a massive success" and that "one cannot even begin to fathom why Nintendo wouldn't see fit to release the game in the West".

Although acclaimed, Mother series writer and creator Shigesato Itoi has stated that he does not have any plans to create a fourth installment in the series.

The Super Smash Bros. series features the characters Ness and Lucas as playable fighters, as well as minor characters as collectibles, items, or stage hazards.

During Nintendo's digital event at E3 2014, Nintendo made a humorous reference to Mother 3s lack of a localization by presenting a stop-motion animation created by Robot Chicken. The short features a fan in attendance talking to then-Nintendo of America President Reggie Fils-Aimé. After the fan says "Come on, Reggie, give us Mother 3!", Fils-Aimé responds by saying "How about this instead?" and then proceeds to eat a Fire Flower from the Super Mario series in order to throw a fireball at the fan.

Notes

References

Sources

External links 
  

2006 video games
Brownie Brown games
Cancelled 64DD games
Cancelled Nintendo 64 games
Cancelled Super Nintendo Entertainment System games
Science fiction comedy
Dinosaurs in video games
Game Boy Advance games
HAL Laboratory games
Japan-exclusive video games
Japanese role-playing video games
Mother (video game series)
Vaporware video games
Video games about psychic powers
Science fantasy video games
Single-player video games
Fiction about suicide
Video game sequels
Video games developed in Japan
Video games set on islands
Video games scored by Shogo Sakai
Video games with oblique graphics
Virtual Console games for Wii U
Works about twin brothers
Media containing Gymnopedies
Fiction about mind control
Video games produced by Kensuke Tanabe